The Serpent (Cul Borson) is a fictional supervillain appearing in American comic books published by Marvel Comics. Known as the Norse God of Fear, he is the brother of Odin and the uncle of Thor as well as a foe of both relatives.

Publication history
The Serpent first appeared in Fear Itself #1 (June 2011), and was created by Stuart Immonen and Matt Fraction.

Fictional character biography
Cul Borson first appears in the 2011 Fear Itself storyline, when he is freed from his underwater prison by the Red Skull who possesses the Hammer of Skadi. Upon emerging as an old man, the Serpent claims that he is the true All-Father of Asgard, and not Odin. The Serpent prepares Skadi's army and calls the Hammers of the Worthy, which he sends to Earth, transforming a number of superhuman beings into his henchmen, the Worthy, who will help him spread fear and chaos across the globe: Juggernaut becomes Kuurth: Breaker of Stone, the Hulk becomes Nul: Breaker of Worlds, Attuma becomes Nerkodd: Breaker of Oceans, Titania becomes Skirn: Breaker of Men, Grey Gargoyle becomes Mokk: Breaker of Faith, Absorbing Man becomes Greithoth: Breaker of Wills, and the Thing becomes Angrir: Breaker of Souls. As the Worthy attack a number of high-profile cities on Earth, the Serpent is rejuvenated by the fear experienced by the global citizenry, restoring his youth. When Thor appears at his stronghold to confront him, the Serpent confirms to Thor that he is the Serpent destined by prophecy to kill Thor, and not the Midgard Serpent. The Serpent reveals that he is Odin's brother and Thor's uncle. He dispatches Thor, sending him to Manhattan, which lies in ruins following an attack by Skadi and two of the Worthy, Nul and Angrir, who then attack Thor.

The Serpent himself later confronts the Avengers, and breaks Captain America's shield with his bare hands before teleporting away. Thor manages to dispatch Nul, who is transformed back into Thing, and as Nul, but is seriously wounded, and transported to Asgard to recuperate. In an attempt to destroy Odin and his followers, the Serpent and his followers appear in Broxton, Oklahoma in order to use Heimdall's Observatory to transport themselves to Asgard. They are confronted by the heroes of Earth, who stage a last stand to prevent them from doing this.

When the healed Thor appears, the Serpent transforms into a giant serpent and battles his nephew while the Avengers fight the Worthy with weapons that Iron Man made in Asgard's workshops. Thor slays his uncle with Odinsword (revealed to be Ragnarok) and dies in the arms of Odin, thus fulfilling the prophecy. Following Thor's funeral, Odin takes the Serpent's corpse to Asgard, casts out the other Asgardians, and locks himself alone with the body until the end of time, blaming himself for not preventing Thor's death.

During the 2014 Original Sin storyline, the Serpent is revived by Odin as he is contacted by Loki.

The Serpent later repents his sins, and is pardoned as a reformed god by Odin, who makes him Royal Inquisitor and Minister of Justice. The Serpent's first task as the Royal Inquisitor is to retrieve Mjolnir from the female Thor. While using the Destroyer armor, the Serpent confronted her as she was about to take action against Malekith the Accursed and Minotaur. The Serpent managed to briefly reclaim Mjolnir until Thor managed to call it back to her. Thor continued her fight against Serpent until she received aid from Thor Odinson, Freyja, and an army of women that Thor Odinson suspected of being the female Thor. After a fierce battle, Freyja convinced Odin to call off Serpent's mission by mocking him.

When Asgardia was destroyed, the Serpent is sent to Svartalfheim by Odin to find out how Malekith's forces are able to travel undetected.

During the War of the Realms storyline, a flashback shows Cul declining Malekith's offer to join the Dark Council. In the present, Cul discovers that Malekith and his forces are using the Black Bifrost Bridge. Cul relays this to Odin, and resolves to remain in Svartalfheim to discover how it works. After spending months studying it, Cul steals some explosives from the Swamp Mines and throws them towards the Bridge. He then discovers that Malekith has enslaved Dark Elf children to mine the explosives. Freeing them, and as a final act of redemption, he urges them to use the explosives to create another escape route while he fends off their guards until he is mortally wounded. In the aftermath of the Swamp Mines' destruction, the freed Dark Elf children began to fight the other Dark Elf soldiers in his honor.

Powers and abilities
Cul  Borson possesses all the conventional attributes of an Asgardian God. However, as the son of Bor, many of these attributes are significantly superior than those possessed by the majority of his race. He possesses sufficient superhuman strength to shatter Captain America's shield with his bare hands. He possesses the ability to manipulate magic as he was able to tele-transport, revive the dead and transform into a giant serpent. As the God of Fear, he could consume the fear of other people to empower himself.

Reception
 In 2020, CBR.com ranked Cul 9th in their "10 Marvel Gods With The Highest Kill Count" list.

In other media
 The Serpent appears in Guardians of the Galaxy, voiced by Robin Atkin Downes. This version planted the World Tree before he was imprisoned in the Darkhawks' realm. Over the course of seven episodes, he escapes his imprisonment in the present, attacks Asgard, and poisons the World Tree, coming into conflict with the titular group, the Avengers, various intergalactic heroes and pirates, and Thanos before Groot uses the Dragonfang sword to purify the World Tree, causing the Serpent to age to dust.
 The Serpent appears in Marvel: Avengers Alliance.

See also
 Nidhogg

References

External links
 Serpent at Marvel Wiki
 Serpent at Comic Vine

Marvel Comics supervillains
Marvel Comics Asgardians
Marvel Comics characters who use magic
Marvel Comics characters with accelerated healing
Marvel Comics characters with superhuman strength
Comics characters introduced in 2011
Fictional characters with superhuman durability or invulnerability
Fictional gods